Powers (2007) is the third book in the trilogy Annals of the Western Shore, sometimes called Chronicles of the Western Shore, a young adult series by Ursula K. Le Guin.  It is preceded in the series by  Voices.
Powers won the 2008 Nebula Award for Best Novel.

Plot 
Gavir is a slave who develops a gift for precognition. He is trained to serve as a teacher for a noble family in the city of Etra; but personal tragedy drives him into the life of a hunted wanderer. He endures adventures, challenges, and suffering. Eventually he escapes to a new and happy life.

References

External links
 

Novels by Ursula K. Le Guin
Nebula Award for Best Novel-winning works
Annals of the Western Shore